Morton C. Blackwell (born November 16, 1939, La Jara, Colorado) is an American conservative activist. He is the founder and president of the Leadership Institute (established 1979), a 501(c)3 non-profit educational foundation that teaches political technology to conservative activists. He currently serves as Virginia's national committeeman on the Republican National Committee.

Biography

In youth politics, Blackwell was a College Republican state chairman and a Young Republican state chairman in Baton Rouge, Louisiana. He served on the Young Republican National Committee for more than a dozen years. He rose to the position of national vice chairman at-large of the Young Republican National Federation. 

Off and on for five and half years, 1965 to 1970, he worked as executive director of the College Republican National Committee under four consecutive College Republican national chairmen. For eight years, he was a member of the Louisiana Republican State Central Committee.

Blackwell worked for seven years under conservative Richard Viguerie, the specialist in direct mail.

Blackwell was first elected to the Arlington County Republican Committee in 1972. He is a member of the Republican Party of Virginia's State Central Committee. 

In 1988, Blackwell was elected as Virginia's Republican National Committeeman, and was re-elected in 1992, 1996, 2000, 2004, 2008, 2012, and 2016. 

In 2004, Blackwell was elected to the Executive Committee of the RNC.

Political activities
Blackwell was Barry Goldwater’s youngest elected delegate to the 1964 Republican National Convention in San Francisco. His Louisiana delegation was headed by gubernatorial candidate Charlton Lyons of Shreveport. In the spring of 1966, he worked for the election of the late Roderick Miller of Lafayette as only the third Republican member of the Louisiana House of Representatives since Reconstruction.

He was a national convention alternate delegate for Ronald W. Reagan in 1968 and 1976, and a Ronald Reagan delegate at the 1980 Republican National Convention. In 1980, he organized and oversaw the national youth effort for Reagan. From 1981 to 1984, Blackwell was a special assistant to President Reagan.

Blackwell was at the center of controversy during the 2004 Republican National Convention, when he passed out Purple Heart bandages which were perceived by some as denigrating the award. The Kerry campaign attacked the activity as the Republican Party mocking United States soldiers. Karl Rove called Blackwell's bandages "inappropriate".

Blackwell is considered something of a specialist in matters relating to the rules of the Republican Party. He served on rules committees of the state Republican parties in Louisiana and Virginia. He serves now on the Standing Committee on Rules of the Republican National Committee and has attended every meeting of the RNC rules committees since 1972.

In September 2016, Blackwell received the second annual Phyllis Schlafly Award for Excellence in Leadership. He was honored for his work as the founder and president of the Leadership Institute in Virginia for its work in recruiting conservatives for roles in politics, government, and the media.

In the 2016 Republican presidential primary, Blackwell endorsed Ted Cruz.

References

Sources
Byron York, The Vast Left Wing Conspiracy (New York, Crown Forum, 2005), pp. 233–34

External links
 
 Virginia GOP: Leadership

1939 births
Living people
People from Conejos County, Colorado
American Episcopalians
Virginia Republicans
Louisiana Republicans
American political activists
Louisiana State University alumni
People from Arlington County, Virginia
College Republicans
People from Baton Rouge, Louisiana
Republican National Committee members